Events from the year 1858 in Sweden

Incumbents
 Monarch – Oscar I

Events
 - The Conventicle Act (Sweden) is removed and the free churches are legalized. 
 - Establishment of the Geological Survey of Sweden
 - Gothenburg Central Station is inaugurated. 
 - Statistics Sweden is created. 
 - Inauguration of Vänortsparken
 - Legal majority for unmarried women (if applied for; automatic legal majority in 1863).
 - Louise Flodin starts her own news paper in Arboga, staffed exclusively by women.
 - The formal right of an employer to physically discipline their adult servants is abolished.

Births
 28 February - Tore Svennberg, actor (died 1941) 
 3 June - Alina Jägerstedt, union worker  (died 1919)
 24 October - Ebba Bernadotte, philanthropist and morganatic consort  (died 1926)
 20 November - Selma Lagerlöf, writer  (died 1940)
 18 December - Kata Dalström, political agitator  (died 1923)

Deaths
 30 March - Marie Kinnberg, photographer and painter (born 1806) 
 15 October - Karl Gustaf Mosander, chemist  (born 1797)
 Ulla Stenberg, artist  (born 1792)
 2 April  – Charlotte Lindmark, ballerina (born 1819)
 31 December – Vilhelmina Gyldenstolpe, court official (born 1779)

References

 
Years of the 19th century in Sweden
Sweden